Wonjong of Joseon or Prince Jeongwon (2 August 1580 – 2 February 1619) was a prince during the Joseon dynasty. He was a son by a concubine to the Joseon dynasty's 14th monarch, king Seonjo, and half brother of king Gwanghaegun and father of king Injo. His birth name was Yi Bu (이부, 李琈).

He first held the title of Prince Jeongwon (定遠君, 정원군) and later re-titled as Grand Internal Prince Jeongwon (定遠大院君, 정원대원군). In 1592, during the Japanese invasions of Korea, he escaped with his father, King Seonjo and awarded in 1604 in recognition of helping the king to escape.

Family
Father: King Seonjo of Joseon (26 November 1552 – 16 March 1608) (조선 선조)
Grandfather: Yi Cho, Grand Internal Prince Deokheung (2 April 1530 – 14 June 1559) (이초 덕흥대원군)
Grandmother: Grand Internal Princess Consort Hadong of the Hadong Jeong clan (23 September 1522 – 24 June 1567) (하동부대부인 정씨)
Mother: Royal Noble Consort In of the Suwon Kim clan (1555–1613) (인빈 김씨)
Grandfather : Kim Han-U (1501–1577) (김한우)
Grandmother: Lady Yi of the Jeonju Yi clan (전주 이씨)
 Siblings 
 Older brother – Yi Seong, Prince Uian (의안군 성) (1577 – 20 March 1588)
 Older brother – Yi Hu, Prince Shinseong (신성군 후) (6 January 1579 – 8 December 1592)
 Younger sister – Princess Jeongshin (정신옹주) (1582/1583–1653)
 Younger sister – Princess Jeonghye (정혜옹주) (1584–1638)
 Younger sister – Princess Jeongsuk (정숙옹주) (19 March 1587 – 5 November 1627)
 Younger brother – Yi Gwang, Prince Uichang (의창군 광) (January 1589 – 15 October 1645)
 Younger sister – Princess Jeongan (정안옹주) (1590–1660)
 Younger sister – Princess Jeonghui (정휘옹주) (1593–1653)
Consorts and their Respective Issue(s):
Queen Inheon of the Neungseong Gu clan (17 April 1578 – 14 January 1626) (인헌왕후 구씨)
Yi Jong, Grand Prince Neungyang (7 December 1595 – 17 June 1649) (이종 능양대군)
Yi Bo, Grand Prince Neungwon (15 May 1598 – 26 January 1656) (이보 능원대군)
Yi Jeon, Grand Prince Neungchang (16 July 1599 – 17 November 1615) (이전 능창대군)
Lady Kim of the Pyeongyang Kim clan (평양 김씨)
Yi Myeong, Prince Neungpung (1596 – November 1604) (이명 능풍군)

Popular culture
Portrayed by Lee Jae-yun in the 1995 KBS2 TV Series West Palace.
 Portrayed by Jang Seung-jo in the 2015 MBC TV series Splendid Politics.

References

See also
History of Korea
Rulers of Korea

16th-century Korean people
17th-century Korean people
1580 births
1619 deaths
House of Yi
Korean princes